Holy Wars is the fourth studio album by American post-punk band Tuxedomoon, released in 1985 by Cramboy. "In a Manner of Speaking" is probably the band's most known song, after being covered by Martin Gore on his 1989 E.P. Counterfeit e.p. and by Nouvelle Vague on their 2004 eponymous debut album.

Track listing

Personnel 
Adapted from the Holy Wars liner notes.

Tuxedomoon
 Steven Brown – lead vocals (2, 4–6, 8, 9), organ (1–4, 7–9), synthesizer (1, 3, 7–9), electric piano (1–3), alto saxophone (1, 7, 8), clarinet (4), keyboards (6), soprano saxophone (7), tape (7), piano (9), drum programming (9),  clapping (9)
 Peter Dachert (as Peter Principle) – bass guitar (1–4, 6–8), tape (2), drum programming (2–4, 6–9), synthesizer (3, 7), guitar (5, 6, 8, 9), cymbal (6),  clapping (9)
 Luc Van Lieshout – trumpet (1–3, 7–9), harmonica (1, 3, 7–9), organ (4), melodica (6), recorder (6), clapping (9)
 Winston Tong – lead vocals (3, 5, 7), backing vocals (2, 8, 9), percussion (9)

Additional musicians
 Jan D'Haese – spoken word (2)
 Bruce Geduldig – whistle (5)
 Alain Lefebvre – percussion (2, 8), Congas (3)
Production and additional personnel
 Bernard Faucon – cover art
 Martine Jawerbaum – executive producer
 Gilles Martin – production, engineering, recording
 Tuxedomoon – production, arrangement

Release history

References

External links 
 

1985 albums
Tuxedomoon albums
Celluloid Records albums
Crammed Discs albums
Restless Records albums
Virgin Records albums